Homonacna is a genus of moths of the family Noctuidae described by David Stephen Fletcher in 1961.

Species of this genus are:

Homonacna alpnista D. S. Fletcher, 1961
Homonacna cadoreli (Viette, 1968)
Homonacna duberneti (Viette, 1968)
Homonacna zebrina (Viette, 1968)

References

Cuculliinae